The Roman Catholic Diocese of Ebolowa is a diocese located in the city of Ebolowa in the Ecclesiastical province of Yaoundé in Cameroon.

History
 May 20, 1991: Established as Diocese of Ebolowa–Kribi from the Diocese of Sangmélima. 
June 19, 2008: Diocese was split to form the Diocese of Ebolowa and the Diocese of Kribi.

Leadership
 Bishops of Ebolowa (Roman rite), in reverse chronological order
 Bishop Philippe Alain Mbarga (October 22, 2016 - present); consecrated, and installed, on the following Dec. 8
 Bishop Jean Mbarga (October 15, 2004  – October 31, 2014); Diocese of Kribi detached; served also as Apostolic Administrator of the Roman Catholic Archdiocese of Yaounde from July 29, 2013; elevated to Archbishop of the Roman Catholic Archdiocese of Yaounde, based in Yaounde, Cameroon, by Pope Francis, while serving as Apostolic Administrator of the Diocese of Ebolowa
 Bishop Jean-Baptiste Ama (May 20, 1991  – March 15, 2002)

See also
Roman Catholicism in Cameroon

References

Sources
 GCatholic.org

Roman Catholic dioceses in Cameroon
Roman Catholic dioceses established in 1991
1991 establishments in Cameroon
Roman Catholic Ecclesiastical Province of Yaoundé